The 1931 Northern League was the third season of speedway racing in the United Kingdom for Northern British teams. It was the final season of the Northern League before amalgamation with the Southern League which also had their third season known as the 1931 Speedway Southern League.

Summary
Following the closure of several clubs from the previous season, only 6 sides started the season and only 4 finished it. There were many team changes from the previous season. Liverpool, Manchester White City, Warrington, Edinburgh, Newcastle, Rochdale Hornets, Barnsley and Wombwell were all no longer participants, while Leeds rejoined after a year's absence.

Belle Vue Aces retained their title, Glasgow White City and Leicester Super withdrew in mid-season but their results stood.

Final table

Top Five Riders

National Trophy
The 1931 National Trophy was the first edition of the Knockout Cup. It was contested between teams from the Southern and Northern Leagues.

For the results of the National Trophy see - 1931 Speedway Southern League

See also
List of United Kingdom Speedway League Champions
Knockout Cup (speedway)

References

Speedway Northern League
1931 in British motorsport
1931 in speedway